is an anime television series serving as a reboot of the 2007–2012 series Bakugan Battle Brawlers. The series is produced by Man of Action, Nelvana and Spin Master Entertainment and animated by TMS Entertainment. Battle Planet premiered in North America in December 2018, airing on Teletoon in Canada and Cartoon Network in the United States, and later debuted in Japan in April 2019.

The second season, titled , premiered on February 16, 2020, in Canada, and on March 1 in the U.S. It was released exclusively online in Japan on April 3, 2020. The third season  premiered on January 24, 2021, in Canada, with its first thirteen episodes streaming on Netflix in the United States starting April 15, 2021. The second half was released on Roblox's Bakugan hub on September 8, 2021, and on Netflix on September 15.

A fourth season, Bakugan: Evolutions, debuted in Canada on Teletoon on February 6, 2022.

A final season titled Bakugan: Legends streamed on Netflix on March 1, 2023.

Plot

The series follows preteens Dan Kouzo, Shun Kazami, Wynton Styles, Lia Venegas, and their dog Lightning. They are known as the "Awesome Ones" (later the “Awesome Brawlers”) and make videos on the website ViewTube. Eventually, they stumble across a race of battling biomechanical creatures called Bakugan. They soon befriend the Bakugan and begin to battle each other with them, all while defending their neighborhood from thugs who use the Bakugan for malicious purposes. They encounter many foes such as Philomena Dusk and the mysterious Magnus, bent on beating Dan in a Bakugan Battle to be the best brawler.

As the Awesome Ones continue to learn more about the Bakugan, they befriend the enigmatic billionaire Benton Dusk, Philomena's brother. Benton uncovers a mysterious underground world he dubs "The Maze", where the Bakugan are enhanced. When a Bakugan hunter named Strata kidnaps several Bakugan, a Bakugan named Phaedrus escapes and warns the Awesome Ones. They go to the Maze and rescue the others, but fall even deeper into it. As they try to make their way home, the Awesome Ones encounter a strange evil Bakugan named Tiko. Drago and the others find a powerful artifact called the Core Cell within the Maze and protect it from Tiko. However, when Drago is injured by the corrupting V Virus, he and Dan retreat into the Core Cell, and Tiko makes it inside. Drago is healed and experiences a power upgrade called a Bakugan Evolution. Drago evolves into Hyper Drago and defeats Tiko. The Awesome Ones then escape the Maze. Soon after, they learn that Magnus is working with Philomina, along with several other of their old rivals, as AAAnimus' publicity team, The Exit. In order to combat them, the Awesome Ones learn, one by one, to evolve their Bakugan without going inside the Core Cell. Eventually, they defeat the Exit and they are fired. Despite their efforts, AAAnimus learns that there are more Core Cells within the Maze, and they successfully extract one. They use it to take control of the Awesome Ones' primary Bakugan. Benton creates a plan to stop them. They break into AAAnimus' headquarters, and while Benton dismantles their network, the Awesome Ones act as decoys. The plan works, and they defeat Philomina. Benton informs the Awesome Ones of his plan to make all the Core Cells open-sourced, which sets them on an adventure around the world. However, even greater threats lurk in the shadows. Tiko survived his battle in the Core Cell, and hatches a plan of his own.

Characters

Voiced by: Jonah Wineberg

Voiced by: Deven Mack

Voiced by: Margarita Valderrama

Voiced by: Jaimee Joe Gonzaga

Voiced by: Will Bowes

Voiced by: Will Bowes

Voiced by: Julius Cho

Voiced by: Josette Jorge

Voiced by: Rob Tinkler

Development
News on a relaunch of the Bakugan property first broke in late 2015 through an investor presentation conducted by Spin Master. Information on the project remained scarce until November 2017 when the company revealed that the new series would launch in 2018/2019. Shortly after, it was discovered that Spin Master had filed a trademark for the name "Bakugan Battle Planet". The following January, Corus Entertainment confirmed its Nelvana subsidiary would again collaborate with TMS Entertainment on the animated series.

In preparation for the relaunch, Spin Master filed patent infringement lawsuits against Alpha Group, GuangZhou Lingdong Creative Culture Technology and Mattel for allegedly violating Bakugan patents in their Screechers Wild, Eonster Hunter, Mecard and Beyblade Burst toylines. Spin Master co-CEO Ronnen Harary stated that Bakugan would be reintroduced globally in 2019.

In March 2018, Harary described the new animated series as utilizing an eleven-minute format. This was done at the request of broadcast partner Cartoon Network, who felt the original's 22-minute episode runtime would not appeal to the current generation of kids. A decision to include more comedic elements was also made. A promotional image for the reboot first surfaced in June 2018 through another Spin Master investor document.

The company formally announced Bakugan Battle Planet on October 9, 2018. Spin Master revealed that the animated series would premiere the following December on Cartoon Network in the United States and Teletoon in Canada with the toys and online web-shorts following shortly after. Cartoon Network had also picked up the show for a 2019 launch in Latin America, EMEA, Australia and New Zealand. In Asia, the series would be distributed by TMS Entertainment with Takara Tomy handling the toyline.

On October 16, 2019, it was announced that it was renewed for a second season titled Bakugan: Armored Alliance, which debuted in 2020.

Media

Animation

Like its predecessor, Bakugan: Battle Planet is an international co-production. The series is produced at TMS Entertainment with additional assistance from Nelvana Enterprises and Spin Master Entertainment. Kazuya Ichikawa directed the series. Kazuhiko Inukai as well as Man of Action Studios act as story editors. The episode scripts are primarily written in Japan, with American writers occasionally contributing. The first season consists of 100 eleven-minute episodes that are also distributed as 50 twenty-two minutes.

Bakugan Battle Planet debuted in the United States on Cartoon Network on December 23, 2018, with the first 20 episodes made available on the channel's video-on-demand services in the days prior. The series then had a five-day linear premiere event before settling into its regular slot on January 12, 2019. In Canada, the series launched on Teletoon on December 31, 2018, through a similar five-day premiere stunt before the show debuted in its regular slot on January 12, 2019. Reruns began airing on sister channel YTV on the 11th. In the UK, the series premiered on Cartoon Network on 23 March 2019, with a free-to-air broadcast on Pop following on 2 September. In Australia, the pay-TV premiere occurred on Cartoon Network on 6 April 2019 with a terrestrial broadcast on 9Go! beginning on 14 July.

The first season launched in Japan on TV Tokyo and other TX Network stations on April 1, 2019. The opening theme song is titled  with the ending theme is titled "Be my story", both songs performed by HiHi Jets. The Japanese version also features an entirely different musical score composed by Yasuharu Takanashi.

Alongside the television series, Spin Master launched a series of animated web-shorts called Bakugan: Beyond the Brawl on YouTube. They feature the Bakugan creatures in comedic situations.

Game

Spin Master has launched a new tabletop game that mixes the traditional transforming Bakugan marbles with a full-fledged trading card game. Co-designed by Justin Gary, the game is intended to appeal to both younger audiences and those wanting a competitive scene.

The game launched in January 2019 in Canada and the United States, with additional markets set throughout the rest of the year.

Video games
In December 2018, Spin Master launched the Bakugan Battle Hub app for iOS and Android devices. It offers character profiles, videos and a simplified version of the tabletop game.

On July 10, 2020, Warner Bros. Interactive Entertainment announced the Bakugan: Champions of Vestroia action role-playing game. Developed by WayForward, it released exclusively on the Nintendo Switch in North America on November 3, 2020.

References

External links

Official Website
Official Website 
Bakugan Battle Planet at Cartoon Network.com
Bakugan Battle Planet at YTV.com
Bakugan Battle Planet at TV Tokyo.co.jp 

Bakugan
2019 Japanese television series debuts
2018 anime television series debuts
Japanese children's animated action television series
Japanese children's animated adventure television series
Japanese children's animated comic science fiction television series
Japanese children's animated science fantasy television series
Cartoon Network original programming
TV Tokyo original programming
TMS Entertainment
Television series by Nelvana
Animated television series about children
Anime television series based on video games
Teletoon original programming